Roberto Laserna (born 1953) is a Bolivian and Spanish writer and economist who earned a PhD from the University of California, Berkeley in regional planning.

Career
He won the Literary National Prize Franz Tamayo in 1976 before becoming a scientist. His book 20 (mis)conceptions on coca and cocaine addresses drug policy and development problems, and La democracia en el ch`enko explains one of the most neglected causes of economic stagnation: economic heterogeneity. In his later book "La Trampa del Rentismo" Laserna presents his theory on the Rent-seeking trap, and explores the influence of the abundance of natural resources in shaping the political institutions and economic culture that drives underdevelopment in Bolivia. 

He has also researched social conflicts, drug trafficking, decentralization and urbanization. He was a professor at Universidad Mayor de San Simon, and has been at Princeton University (2003–2004). He is a researcher at CERES, a private research center in Cochabamba and President of Fundacion Milenio, a  think tank in La Paz.

Works
2011     El fracaso del prohibicionismo. Fundación Vicente Pazos Kanki, La Paz.
2008     La riqueza nacional para la gente. (Working Paper) La Paz, Fundación Milenio.
2005     Ciudades y pobreza. Cochabamba, UMSS. 
2004 	La democracia en el ch´enko. La Paz, Fundación Milenio.  (three editions)
2001	Conflictos sociales y movimientos políticos. El año 2000 en Bolivia. Documentos de Trabajo. Cochabamba, Ceres-Dfid.
1997	20 (mis)conceptions on coca and cocaine. La Paz, Plural Publishers.
1996 	20 Juicios y Prejuicios sobre coca-cocaína. La Paz, Ed. Clave-Plataforma de contrapartes Novib.
1994a	Las Drogas y el Ajuste en Bolivia. Economía clandestina y políticas públicas. La Paz, Ed. CEDLA.
1994b	La Masacre del Valle. El desencuentro militar campesino. Cochabamba, Ed. CERES.
1992 	Productores de Democracia. Acción social y procesos políticos en Bolivia (1971–1991). Cochabamba, Ed. FACES/CERES.
1984 	Espacio y sociedad regional. Cochabamba, Ed. CERES.

Co authored Works
2008     Conflicto social y crecimiento económico en Bolivia. With José Luis Evia and Stergios Skaperdas. La Paz, Instituto para la Democracia, Ceres and Cosude.
2008  
2007   Constitución y poder político. Con Luis Verdesoto, Henry Oporto y Maria Teresa Zegada. Ed. Plural. La Paz.
2006    La trampa del rentismo. La Paz, Fundación Milenio, with Jose M. Gordillo and Jorge Komadina. (two editions)
2004	Derechos humanos en Bolivia. Proceso y desafìos. (Coordinator) La Paz, Defensor del Pueblo.
2002	Actuar en proyectos, pensar en procesos. De Río a Johannesburgo: experiencias latinoamericanas hacia el desarrollo sostenible. Coordinator and writer in the production of this book from the Red Humana Agenda 21-América Latina. Serie Approaches to Sustainability, Regional Study. New York, Capacity 21, PNUD.
1999	Empujando la concertación. Marchas campesinas, opinión pública y coca. With Natalia Camacho and Eduardo Córdova. La Paz, Ed. Pieb-Ceres.
1998	El Desarrollo Humano en Bolivia 1998. Co-author, responsible of the section "Reducir las Brechas y Construir la Equidad" . La Paz, PNUD.
1997c	La Seguridad Humana en Bolivia. Co-author, responsible of "Seguridad Económica". La Paz, Ed. PNUD-ILDIS.
1997a	La Fuerza de la Equidad. El desarrollo Humano en Bolivia. With Fernando Calderón G. La Paz, Ed. Los Amigos del Libro.
1996b 	El Circuito coca cocaína y sus implicaciones. With Alain Touraine and Gustavo Fernández. La Paz, Ed. Ildis.
1995a	Sostenibilidad y Desarrollo Humano. Calidad de Vida en Cochabamba. In collaboration with Jorge Cortés, Carmen Ledo, Alejandra Ramírez and Roberto Valdivieso. Cochabamba, Ed. Los Amigos del Libro.
1995b	Los Mercados Vallunos de Tierras. With  Alberto Rivera and Juan Torrico. La Paz, Ed. Ildis, Ceres.
1994 a	Paradojas de la Modernidad. Sociedad y Cambios en Bolivia; co-authored with Fernando Calderón. La Paz, Ed. Fundación Milenio.
1991 	La Nueva Dependencia. Cambio tecnológico y reestructuración socio-económica en América Latina; coauthored with Manuel Castells. Cochabamba, Ed. CERES.
1989 	Desktop Mapping for Planning and Decision Making; with John D. Landis. San Jose (CA), Strategic Mapping.
1979	La Pobreza en Cochabamba (un análisis socio-económico en la periferia urbana). With Fernando Cosío. Cochabamba, Publicaciones IESE.

On the author:
Caceres Romero Adolfo, Diccionario de la Literatura Boliviana, Ed Los Amigos del Libro.

Molina Fernando, El pensamiento boliviano sobre los recursos naturales, Ed. Pulso, La Paz.

Guttentag Tichauer Werner, Bio-bibliografia boliviana (several years). 

By the author:
Urbanizacion y pobreza, Ed. Pulso, La Paz, 2007
La trampa del rentismo, Ed. Milenio, La Paz, 2006
La democracia en el ch'enko, Ed. Milenio/Ceres, La Paz, 2005
20 (mis)conceptions on coca and cocaine, Ed. Clave, La Paz, 1997
See also:
Socio-political conflict and economic performance in Bolivia, with Jose Luis Evia and Stergios Skaperdas,  https://ssrn.com/abstract=1104954
Decentralization, Local Iniktiatives and Cirizenship in Bolivia, 1994–2004, in the book Participatory Innovation and Representative Democracy in Latin America, edited by Andrew Selee and Enrique Peruzzotti, The Johns Hopkins University/Woodrow Wilson Center Press, 2009

References
 

1953 births
Living people
Bolivian economists
Bolivian male writers
UC Berkeley College of Environmental Design alumni
Princeton University faculty
Members of the Inter-American Dialogue